The 2021 Motorcycle Grand Prix of the Americas (officially known as the Red Bull Grand Prix of the Americas) was the fifteenth round of the 2021 Grand Prix motorcycle racing season. It was held at the Circuit of the Americas in Austin on October 3, 2021.

Background
The event returned after a one-year absence due to the COVID-19 pandemic. It was originally scheduled for 18 April, but was postponed on 22 January along with the Argentine Grand Prix due to travel restrictions related to the COVID-19 pandemic, and was replaced by the Portuguese Grand Prix. On 23 June, the event was rescheduled for 3 October following the cancellation of the Japanese Grand Prix.

Qualifying

MotoGP

Race

MotoGP

Moto2

 Nicolò Bulega was declared unfit to compete due to a leg bruise suffered in crash during free practice.

Moto3
The race, scheduled to be run for 17 laps, was red-flagged after 7 full laps due to an accident involving Filip Salač. The race was later restarted over 5 laps but red-flagged again due to an accident involving multiple riders. The race was not restarted, final results were determined by the first part and full points were awarded.

 Sergio García suffered from kidney hematoma following a crash during free practice and withdrew from the event.

Championship standings after the race
Below are the standings for the top five riders, constructors, and teams after the round.

MotoGP

Riders' Championship standings

Constructors' Championship standings

Teams' Championship standings

Moto2

Riders' Championship standings

Constructors' Championship standings

Teams' Championship standings

Moto3

Riders' Championship standings

Constructors' Championship standings

Teams' Championship standings

Notes

References

External links

Americas
Motorcycle Grand Prix of the Americas
Motorcycle Grand Prix of the Americas
Motorcycle Grand Prix of the Americas